Dolné Orešany is a village and municipality of Trnava District in the Trnava region of Slovakia.

Gallery

See also
 List of municipalities and towns in Slovakia

References

Genealogical resources

The records for genealogical research are available at the state archive "Statny Archiv in Bratislava, Slovakia"

 Roman Catholic church records (births/marriages/deaths): 1695-1895 (parish A)
 Lutheran church records (births/marriages/deaths): 1666-1895 (parish B)

External links
 www.dolneoresany.sk - official website

Surnames of living people in Dolne Oresany

Villages and municipalities in Trnava District